The Alliance Sport Alsace, simply known as ASA, is a French professional basketball club based in Souffelweyersheim and Gries. Founded in 2021, the team plays in the LNB Pro B.

History
The club was formed in 2021 by the merger of five clubs: BC Gries-Oberhoffen, BC Souffelweyersheim, BC Nord Alsace, Weyersheim BB and Walbourg-Eschbach Basket.

Players

Roster

Notable players
To appear in this section a player must have either:
- Set a club record or won an individual award as a professional player.
- Played at least one official international match for his senior national team at any time.
 Jimmy Djimrabaye
 Kyan Anderson

References

External links
Official website (in French)

Basketball teams in France
Basketball teams established in 2021
Sport in Bas-Rhin